Benjamin David "Ben" Rushgrove (born 23 February 1988 in Bath) is a British sprint runner with cerebral palsy and hearing impairment. He runs in the T36 classification, and set a world record for the T36 200m at the 2007 Visa Paralympic World Cup, becoming the first athlete to achieve under 25 seconds in the event.

He represented Great Britain in the T36 100m and 200m at the 2008 Summer Paralympics. Ben won a silver medal in the T36 100m at the Paralympic Games in Beijing 2008 in a time of 12.35 seconds. He was forced to withdraw from the 200 m event due to a foot injury. He is also involved in training Future Paralympic hopefuls at P2P Days in Bath. At the 2012 Summer Paralympics held in London, Rushgrove won the bronze medal in the T36 Men's 200 m

References

External links
 Profile at TeamBath

1988 births
Athletes (track and field) at the 2008 Summer Paralympics
Living people
Paralympic athletes of Great Britain
Paralympic silver medalists for Great Britain
Athletes (track and field) at the 2012 Summer Paralympics
Paralympic bronze medalists for Great Britain
British male sprinters
Track and field athletes with cerebral palsy
Medalists at the 2008 Summer Paralympics
Medalists at the 2012 Summer Paralympics
Team Bath track and field athletes
Team Bath Paralympic athletes
Medalists at the World Para Athletics Championships
Medalists at the World Para Athletics European Championships
Paralympic medalists in athletics (track and field)